The twelfth season of the Pakistani music television series Coke Studio commenced airing on 11 October 2019, and concluded on 29 November 2019. The season was produced by Rohail Hyatt, after Ali Hamza and Zohaib Kazi stepped down from the role after just one season. Coca-Cola Pakistan remained as an executive producer.

"Wohi Khuda Hai" was the season opener. The season consisted of 20 tracks and one season opener/premiere song released in the span of one and a half month.

Artists

Featured artists  

 Abrar-ul-Haq
 Aima Baig
 Ali Sethi
 Atif Aslam
 Banur's Band
 Barkat Jamal Fakir Troupe
 Fareed Ayaz and Abu Muhammad
 Fariha Pervez
 Hadiqa Kiani
 Harsakhiyan
 Kashif Din
 Nimra Rafiq
 Qurat-ul-Ain Balouch
 Rachel Viccaji
 Rahat Fateh Ali Khan
 Sahir Ali Bagga
 Sanam Marvi
 Shahab Hussain
 Shamali Afghan
 Shuja Haider
 Umair Jaswal
 Zeb Bangash
 Zoe Viccaji

Backing vocals 

 Rachel Viccaji
 Mehr Qadir
 Nimra Rafiq
 Shahab Hussain

Musicians 
Season 12 featured Coke Studio's first female house band member Abier "Veeru" Shan in the role multi-percussionist.

Production 
Following middling reviews and dwindling television rating points of subsequent seasons, Rohail Hyatt, the founder of the show, returned as the producer after 5 years. The series was produced under Rohail Hyatt's production company Frequency Media and was distributed by Coca-Cola Pakistan.

Speaking at the launch of Coke Studio Season 12, Rohail Hyatt said:

General Manager of Coca-Cola Pakistan, Rizwan U. Khan said,

Episodes 
Season 12 ended the tradition of starting a new season with a patriotic song; a tradition which started in season 8. The season featured six episodes and one season opener/premiere, making a total of 21 songs.

Copyright issues 
The season faced four copyright claim issues. The video of Abrar-ul-Haq's "Billo" and Shuja Haider and Rachel Viccaji's "Saiyaan", songs from Episode 2, were taken down by YouTube due to a copyright claim. Saiyaan was later restored. Sanam Marvi's "Hairaan Hua" from Episode 4 was taken down by YouTube due to a copyright claim by Abida Parveen, though it was later restored. At last Ali Sethi and Qurat-ul-Ain Balouch's "Mundiya" was taken down by YouTube from Episode 6.

Notes and references

Notes

References

External links 
 
 

Season12
2019 Pakistani television seasons